Anthony Hill (23 April 1930 – 13 October 2020) was an English artist, painter and relief-maker, originally a member of the post-World War II British art movement termed the Constructionist Group whose work was essentially in the international constructivist tradition.

Biography
His fellow members in this group were Victor Pasmore, Adrian Heath, John Ernest, Kenneth Martin, Mary Martin, Gillian Wise (artist) and Stephen Gilbert. He was born on 23 April 1930 in London, and studied at the St Martin's and the Central Schools of Art 1948–51. He began painting in the style of Dada and Surrealism in 1948 but quickly moved on to geometric abstract idioms. He made his first relief in 1954 and abandoned painting for relief-making in 1956. One feature of these reliefs has been the use of non-traditional materials such as industrial aluminium and Perspex. His first one-man show of reliefs was held at the Institute of Contemporary Arts in 1958. He has participated in exhibitions of abstract and constructivist art in the UK, Paris, Germany, Holland, Poland, Switzerland and the USA. In 1978 he exhibited in the Arts Council's exhibition, Constructive Context, alongside a number if artists such as Jeffrey Steele and Peter Lowe who had begun working in a systematised constructive mode in the mid to late 1960s and came together in the Systems Group in December 1969. Hill, however, along with the Martins, declined membership of this group. In 1983 the Hayward Gallery held a major retrospective exhibition of Anthony Hill's constructivist work.

Anthony Hill has had a lifelong fascination with mathematics, and there are many mathematicians among his circle of acquaintances. Together with his colleague John Ernest he made contributions to graph theory (crossing number) and in 1979, in recognition of a number of his mathematical papers, he was elected a member of the London Mathematical Society and made a visiting research associate in the Department of Mathematics at University College, London. But although almost all his reliefs have an underlying mathematical structure or logic, he was always insistent that in his art, in his own words, "the mathematical thematic or mathematical process can only be a component: one is calculating or organising something which is clearly not mathematical."  From the late 1980s onward, working in parallel with his systems-based work but in a very different mode, Anthony Hill exhibited dadaist pictures and collages under the pseudonym Achill Redo. The Tate Gallery, London has collections under both of the names Anthony Hill and Achill Redo.

An excellent summary of the life and constructivist work of Anthony Hill, together with that of the other British constructivists, is given in Alastair Grieve's authoritative book of 2005.

He died on 13 October 2020 at the age of 90.

References

 Fowler, Alan. Essay in online Philosophy of Mathematics Education Journal No. 24, December 2009, 'A Rational Aesthetic'.
 Fowler, Alan, Essay, 'The Systems Group and its Constructivist Context', in exhibition catalogue 'A Rational Aesthetic', Southampton City Art Gallery, 2009.
 Grieve, Alastair, Essay in exhibition catalogue 'Anthony Hill', Arts Council, London, 1983
 Grieve, Alastair Constructed Abstract Art in England After the Second World War: A Neglected Avant Garde, Yale University Press. 2005. .
 Harary, Frank and Hill, Anthony. On the number of crossings in a complete graph. Proceedings of the Edinburgh Math. Society (2), 13:333-338, 1962/1963.
 Hill, Anthony, editor Data: Directions in Art, Theory and Aesthetics, Faber and Faber. 1968. 
 Hill, Anthony, editor Duchamp: Passim, Craftsman House. 1994.

External links
 Artworks in the Tate collection by Anthony Hill
 Artworks in the Tate collection under the pseudonym Achill Redo
 

20th-century English painters
English male painters
21st-century English painters
21st-century English male artists
1930 births
2020 deaths
Mathematical artists
20th-century English male artists